Mount Sinai is an unincorporated community in Hogan Township, Dearborn County, Indiana.

History
Mount Sinai took its name from Mount Sinai Methodist Episcopal Church. The namesake church was completed in about 1835, and has since been torn down.

Geography

References

Unincorporated communities in Dearborn County, Indiana
Unincorporated communities in Indiana